Matúš Begala (born 7 April 2001) is a Slovak footballer who plays for Zemplín Michalovce as a midfielder.

Club career

MFK Zemplín Michalovce
Begala made his Frotuna Liga debut for Zemplín Michalovce against Senica on 9 December 2017. Begala replaced Martin Regáli in stoppage time of the 1:1 game. Stanislav Danko had equalised for Michalovce, but Jurij Medveděv had scored for the home side.

References

External links
 Futbalsfz profile 
 
 Futbalnet profile 
 

2001 births
Living people
People from Stará Ľubovňa
Sportspeople from the Prešov Region
Slovak footballers
Slovakia youth international footballers
Association football midfielders
MFK Zemplín Michalovce players
Slovak Super Liga players